Jennifer Brady was the defending champion, but she chose to compete in Sacramento instead.

Cristiana Ferrando won the title, defeating Katherine Sebov in the final, 6–2, 6–3.

Seeds

Draw

Finals

Top half

Bottom half

References
Main Draw

Challenger Banque Nationale de Granby
Challenger de Granby